Hunter Boats Limited is a British boat builder presently based in Southampton. The company specializes in the design and manufacture of glassfibre sailboats.

The company was founded by in 1969 by Michael Polard, as the Essex Boat Company. In 2009 it became a brand of Lauren Marine of Southampton under the name British Hunter.

History
The first design produced by the new company was the Squib, an open keelboat designed by Oliver Lee in 1967. Lee also designed a cabin version of the Squib in 1972, the Hunter 19, later called the Europa. Lee was the principle naval architect for the company in this period, designing the Hunter 490 and the Hunter 701.

In the early 1970s the company relocated to Rochford and a custom-built plant in that town. At that time it was renamed Hunter Boats Limited and by 1975 David Thomas became the main designer. He drew the Hunter Sonata and the Impala 28.

In the mid-1970s the company produced many racing sailboats, including the designs of Steven Jones, including the Formula 28. His HB 31 was the first production boat to use kevlar laminates in its hull construction. By the 1980s the company started building boats with twin keels and moved away from racing boats to cruising boat designs. The Hunter Horizon 26 was the first of this new range of cruising sailboats and it won the Best Production Boat of the Year award when it was introduced in 1984. The Hunter Horizon 32 also won Best Production Cruiser of the Year in 1987 as the company continued to specialize in cruising sailboats.

In 1995 the company introduced the Thomas-designed Hunter 707 and the following year it was named Yacht of the Year.

Hunter Boats was bought out in 2003 by the Select Yachts Group and added to its portfolio of marine companies that included Cornish Crabbers, Red Fox Yachts, the Landau Launch Company and Cornish Diva.

In 2009 Lauren Marine of Southampton purchased the rights, molds and tooling for the Hunter range of boats and built them under the brand of British Hunter, to distinguish it from the American boat building company, Hunter Marine.

In 2018 the company was producing five designs, the Hunter 20 Sport, Hunter 20 Mini C, Hunter Channel 245, Hunter Channel 27 and the Hunter Channel 31.

Boats 
Summary of boats built by Hunter Boats:

Squib 1967
Hunter 701 (Lee) 1971
Hunter 19 (Europa)  1972
Hunter 490 (Lee)  1972
Hunter Sonata 1976
Impala 28 (Thomas) 1977
Hunter Medina 20 1979
Delta 25 (Hunter) 1980
Hunter 32 (Jones) 1982
Liberty 22 1982
HB 31 1983
Formula One (Jones) 1984
Formula 28 1984
Hunter Horizon 26 1984
Duette 23 1984
Hunter Horizon 32 1987
Minstrel 23 1987
Hunter Horizon 27 1988
Hunter Horizon 27 OOD 1989
Hunter Horizon 272 1993
Hunter Horizon 273 1988
Hunter Horizon 23 1989
Red Fox 200 1990
Channel 323 (Hunter)  1991
Hunter Horizon 21 1992
Hunter Horizon 30 1993
Ranger 265 (Thomas) 1994
Hunter 707 1995
Pilot 27  1996
Ranger 245 (Thomas)  1996
Channel 27 (Hunter) 1999
Channel 31 (Hunter) 2000
Mystery 35 (Hunter) 2003
Hunter 20 Fox C 2000s
Hunter 20 Sport 2010s
Hunter 20 Mini C 2010s
Hunter Channel 245 2010s

See also
List of sailboat designers and manufacturers

References

External links

Hunter Boats